Real income is the income of individuals or nations after adjusting for inflation. It is calculated by dividing nominal income by the price level. Real variables such as real income and real GDP are variables that are measured in physical units, while nominal variables such as nominal income and nominal GDP are measured in monetary units. Therefore, real income is a more useful indicator of well-being since it measures the amount of goods and services that can be purchased with the income.

According to the classical dichotomy theory, real variables and nominal variables are separate in the long run, so they are not influenced by each other. In other words, if the nominal starting income was 100 and there was 10% inflation (general rise in prices, for example, what cost 10 now costs 11), then with nominal income of still 100, one can buy roughly 9% less; so if nominal income was not adjusted for inflation (did not rise by 10%), real income has dropped by approximately 9%. But if the classical dichotomy holds, nominal income will eventually go up by 10%, leaving real income unchanged from its original value.

References

Household income